The Oceania Cup is an international men's field hockey competition organised by Oceania Hockey Federation (OHF). It is held every two years to determine which teams will receive an automatic berth to the Men's FIH Hockey World Cup and Summer Olympics.

Only Australia and New Zealand have reached the finals as of 2015. Australia has won all titles.

Summaries

Medal table

Team appearances

See also
Field hockey at the Pacific Games
Women's Oceania Cup

References

External links
2005 Oceania Cup

 
International field hockey competitions in Oceania
Oceanian championships
Recurring sporting events established in 1999
1999 establishments in Oceania